The 1991 riot in Zadar was an act of violence that took place in the Croatian city of Zadar on 2 May 1991. Following an incident in the Zadar hinterland in which a Croatian policeman was killed, reportedly by SAO Krajina militiamen, Croatian civilians vandalized, destroyed and looted properties belonging to ethnic Serbs and Yugoslav companies in the city.

Background

Tensions between Croats and Serbs increased steadily through 1990 and 1991 following the electoral victory of Croatia's nationalist Croatian Democratic Union party, led by Franjo Tuđman. Many Serbs were deeply unhappy about the prospect of living as a minority in an independent Croatia. In the summer of 1990, they took up arms in the largely Serb-populated regions of inland Dalmatia, calling the breakaway region "SAO Krajina", sealing roads and effectively blocking Dalmatia from the rest of Croatia. The insurrection spread to the eastern region of Slavonia in early 1991, when paramilitary groups from Serbia itself took up positions in the region and started to expel non-Serbs from the area, reportedly associated with the Serbian Radical Party.

On 2 May 1991, paramilitaries killed twelve Croatian policemen in  Borovo Selo and reportedly mutilated some or all of the bodies. This was, at the time, the bloodiest single incident in the Croatian conflict, and it caused widespread shock and outrage in Croatia. The killings produced an immediate upsurge in ethnic tensions.

Riot
On 2 May, a 23-year-old Croatian policeman, Franko Lisica, was killed near Polača in northern Dalmatia. The police attributed his death to close range enemy weapons fire, presumably by Krajina Serb militiamen.

Later the same day, on 2 May 1991, a group of people entered Zadar from its southeastern suburb of Gaženica, starting a riot whose apparent aim was to destroy and loot properties belonging either to ethnic Serbs or to Yugoslav companies such as JAT.

The rioting started in the afternoon and lasted for hours, while the damaged properties were still being looted by individuals the following day. Đuro Kresović, at the time the head of the Criminal department of the Municipal Court of Zadar, witnessed the effects of the riot on 3 May and assessed the number of demolished properties at over 130, given that an insurance company made a list of 136 destroyed properties.

As there were so many broken windows in the city centre streets, the next day Narodni list, a Zadar newspaper, published the headline Zadarska noć kristala (roughly translated as "Zadar's night of [broken] glass", and the incident was later referred to by some sources as the kristalna noć (or Kristallnacht) of Zadar. The Croatian police response was inadequate, while the insurance company Croatia osiguranje agreed to compensate the Serb business owners for the riot damage. Đuro Kresović claimed the police station in Zadar and many of its uniformed officers were actively involved in the lead-up to the riot and the rioting itself. Kresović was demoted and afterwards discharged from his position at the Municipal Court.

Immediately afterwards, anti-Croat rioting took place in the Krajina.

Aftermath
A separate protest at the naval headquarters in Split, the 1991 protest in Split, happened on 6 May, where one Yugoslav Army soldier was killed and another wounded by protestors.

In July, JNA and Serb forces launched the attack on Croatian-populated Dalmatia, starting the battle of Zadar, in which there were 34 casualties. In 1995, the government of FR Yugoslavia made a report that claimed the number of properties destroyed to have been at least 168, and it accused local HDZ officials of having instigated the violence. It claimed that the riot was "organized by a number of the HDZ activists and the highest-ranking officials in Zadar, in the presence of highest-ranking HDZ officials Vladimir Šeks, deputy Speaker of the Croatian Parliament, and Petar Šale". The State Attorney's Office in Split had an open case regarding the riot but it was closed with no charges filed in 2002.

Marko Atlagić, a RSK minister, referred to it in a similar context during the trial of Slobodan Milošević.

References

Zadar Anti-Serb Riot, 1991
Zadar Anti-Serb Riot, 1991
Breakup of Yugoslavia
Zadar
Riots and civil disorder in Croatia
History of the Serbs of Croatia
May 1991 events in Europe
History of Zadar